Image of Death is a 1978 Australian TV movie about a woman who likes to live off other people's money.

It was produced by Robert Bruning's Gemini Productions. Director Kevin Dobson recalled it as an attempt by Bruning and Grundys "to make mid-Atlantic films for the US market. It was pretty ill-fated."

Plot
A woman kills her friend and takes over her identity.

Cast
Cathey Paine as Yvonne Arthur
Penne Hackforth-Jones as Maureen
Cheryl Waters as Barbara Shields
Sheila Helpmann as Lidia
Barry Creyton as TV producer
Barry Pierce as Mark
Tony Bonner as Carl
Queenie Ashton as Mrs Brooks
Max Meldrum as Gallery owner.

Production
Cheryl Waters was an Australian actor living in LA when cast. Cathey Paine was American.

References

External links
Image of Death at Peter Malone website
Image of Death at National Film and Sound Archive

Image of Death at AustLit (subscription required)

Australian television films
1978 television films
1978 films
Films directed by Kevin James Dobson
1970s English-language films
1970s Australian films